The gehu (革胡; pinyin: géhú) is a Chinese instrument developed in the 20th century by the Chinese musician Yang Yusen (杨 雨 森, 1926–1980). It is a fusion of the Chinese huqin family and the cello. Its four strings are also tuned (from low to high) C-G-D-A, exactly like the cello's. Unlike most other musical instruments in the huqin family, the bridge does not contact the snakeskin, which faces to the side.

There is also a contrabass gehu that functions as a Chinese double bass, known as the diyingehu, digehu, or beigehu (倍 革 胡).

By the late 20th century the gehu had become a rare instrument, even within China, as the tendency for the snakeskin to lose its tightness increases with humidity. Today, it is used mostly in Hong Kong and Taiwan, although even there, the cello is beginning to become a popular replacement for it. There are also other Chinese instruments that are able to take on the role of bowed bass range instrument, such as the laruan (which uses the structure and acoustics of the ruan), the lapa (also known as paqin, using the structure of the pipa), and the bass matouqin.

See also
 Dahu
 Dihu
 Chinese music
 List of Chinese musical instruments
 Huqin

References

External links
 Gehu page from Paul and Bernice Noll Website
 Gehu page (Chinese)
 "Chinese Version of the Cello and Double Bass, by Brandon Voo

Video
 Video of a piece for gehu and Chinese traditional instrument orchestra, entitled 草原风情 ("Grasslands Character and Style"), performed by Dong Jinchi (董金池), from CCTV
 Rossini Duet for Cello and Double Bass, played by a gehu and diyingehu.

Chinese musical instruments
Huqin family instruments
Bowed instruments
Drumhead lutes